Daniel Lück (born 18 May 1991) is a German former professional footballer who played as a goalkeeper.

References

1991 births
Living people
German footballers
Association football goalkeepers
2. Bundesliga players
3. Liga players
Austrian Football Bundesliga players
TSG 1899 Hoffenheim II players
SC Paderborn 07 players
FC Energie Cottbus players
SK Sturm Graz players
German expatriate footballers
German expatriate sportspeople in Austria
Expatriate footballers in Austria